Dutchy's Hole Park or Robinson Park is a park on the Rideau River in Ottawa, Ontario, Canada. It is part of the downtown Ottawa neighbourhood of Sandy Hill. The park has a wading pool, playground, and a football field, called Robinson Field. Pathways connect the park with Strathcona Park, the Rideau Campus of the University of Ottawa and via a former train bridge with Parc Riverain/River Road Park across the Rideau River in Vanier.

The park includes a football field, called Robinsonfield, the Dutchie's Hole Wading Pool, and the Sandy Hill and Strathcona Heights community gardens.
It is one of three locations the City of Ottawa uses to release mute swans and black swans that inhabit the Rideau River during the summer months.

See also
List of Ottawa parks

References

Parks in Ottawa